Rufus Smith Frost (July 18, 1826 – March 6, 1894) was a U.S. Representative from Massachusetts.

Born in Marlborough, New Hampshire to Joseph Frost and Lucy (Wheeler) Frost, the family moved to Boston, Massachusetts, in 1833, where Frost attended the public schools. He engaged in mercantile pursuits and participated in local politics, serving as mayor of Chelsea, Massachusetts, in 1867 and 1868, as a member of the Massachusetts State Senate in 1871 and 1872, and of the Governor's council in 1873 and 1874.

Frost presented credentials as a Republican Member-elect to the Forty-fourth Congress and served from March 4, 1875, until July 28, 1876, when he was succeeded by Josiah G. Abbott, who contested his election. He was an unsuccessful candidate for election in 1876 to the Forty-fifth Congress.

He served as president of the National Association of Woolen Manufacturers from 1877 to 1884, and of the Boston Board of Trade from 1878 to 1880. A patron of the arts, he served as president of the New England Conservatory of Music, and was one of the founders of the New England Law and Order League and of the Boston Art Club. He also served as delegate to the 1892 Republican National Convention.

Frost died in Chicago, Illinois, at the age of 67. He was interred in Woodlawn Cemetery, Chelsea, Massachusetts.

See also
 1871 Massachusetts legislature
 1872 Massachusetts legislature

References

 The New York Times, Ex-Congressman Frost's Remains. Page 9 (March 8, 1894).
Rand, John Clark, One of a Thousand A series of Biographical Sketches of One Thousand Representative Men Resident in the Commonwealth of Massachusetts. pages 235–236, (1890).
 Johnson, Rossiter.: The Twentieth Century Biographical Dictionary of Notable Americans Vol. IV, (1904).
 Toomey, Daniel P.: ''Massachusetts of Today: A Memorial of the State, Historical and Biographical, Issued for the World's Columbian Exposition at Chicago.'' page 379 (1892).

External links
Boston Art Club: official website
Mayors of Chelsea 1857 – 1991.
 

1826 births
1894 deaths
Mayors of Chelsea, Massachusetts
Republican Party members of the United States House of Representatives from Massachusetts
Republican Party Massachusetts state senators
19th-century American politicians
People from Marlborough, New Hampshire